The LG Optimus G Pro is a flagship smartphone/phablet designed and manufactured by LG Electronics.  It was released in the U.S. on May 10, 2013.

Availability

North America
In the United States, the Optimus G Pro was available through AT&T for $99.99 with a 2-year contract and data plan. At release, it was priced at $199.99.

Specifications

Hardware

Processor
The LG Optimus G Pro features a Qualcomm Snapdragon 600 APQ8064 SoC with a Quad-core Krait processor clocked at 1.7 GHz. The processor is based on 28 nm semiconductor technology with Adreno 320 graphics processor running at 400 MHz.

Memory
The LG Optimus G Pro has 2 GB of RAM and 16\32 GB of internal storage which may be expanded via a microSD card up to 64 GB.

Screen
The phone features a 5.5" True HD IPS LCD of 1080x1920 resolution and displaying 16,777,216 colors at ~401 PPI pixel density.

Cameras
The LG Optimus G Pro has a 13 MP back-illuminated camera sensor and a single LED flash for both AT&T and Sprint. The phone is also capable of recording FullHD 1080p video at 30 FPS. The phone also features a front-facing 2.1 MP camera, capable of recording HD 720p video at 30 FPS. The Indian LG Optimus G Pro features a 13 MP camera. The camera supports digital zoom of up to 8X magnification.

Battery
The LG Optimus G is powered by a standard Lithium-Polymer battery of 3140 mAh.

Software
The LG Optimus G runs on Google's Android 4.1.2 Jelly Bean operating system skinned with LG Optimus UI 3.0. LG has released the Android 4.4 KitKat firmware update on March 21, 2014 for LG Optimus G Pro.

Critical reception
LG Optimus G Pro has received a generally favorable reception. CNET reviewed it as "a great performer" with a score of 4 out of 5 stars. PhoneNews reviewed it "a feature laden handset with excellent software".

See also
LG Optimus series

References

External links 
 

Android (operating system) devices
Optimus G Pro
Phablets
Mobile phones introduced in 2013
Discontinued smartphones
Mobile phones with user-replaceable battery
Mobile phones with infrared transmitter